Helenium bigelovii is a North American perennial plant in the sunflower family, commonly known as Bigelow's sneezeweed. 
It grows in moist areas such as meadows, marshes, or streamsides. It is found at moderate and higher elevations (3000-10,000 ft) in the foothills and mountains of California and Oregon: Cascades, Coast Ranges, Klamath Mountains, Sierra Nevada, etc. Cultivars of the species are used in gardening as ornamentals.

One plant can produce as many as 20 flower heads, either one per branch or in branching arrays. Each head has 14-20 yellow ray florets (bending backwards and with teeth at the tips) surrounding sometimes as many as 800 disc florets (yellow at first, turning brown as they get older).

The species is named for J.M. Bigelow, a plant collector on the United States and Mexican Boundary Survey in the 1850s.

References

External links
Jepson Manual Treatment
United States Department of Agriculture Plants Profile
CalPhotos photos gallery, University of California, Helenium bigelovii

Flora of Oregon
Plants described in 1857
Flora of California
Bigelovii
Flora without expected TNC conservation status